Yaneth Giha Tovar is an economist and politician who served as the Colombian Minister of Education from 2016 to 2018. Yaneth Giha has also held the position of Director of Colcienas and Deputy Minister of Defence (2010–2013). Yaneth obtained an economics degree from University of Los Andes, and a master's degree from King's College London.

References

Year of birth missing (living people)
Living people
Colombian politicians
University of Los Andes (Colombia) alumni
Alumni of King's College London
Colombian Ministers of National Education
Women government ministers of Colombia